Miguel Alexander Carranza Macahuachi (born 3 November 1995) is a Peruvian footballer who plays as a right winger for Cusco FC.

Career

Club career
Carranza is a product of Unión Comercio and got his debut for the club in the 2014 season, where he played a total of 11 games in the Peruvian Primera División. He quickly became a regular starter and made a total of 144 league appearances for Unión Comercio until he left at the end of 2019.

In January 2020, Carranza joined Cusco FC. He made his debut on 3 February 2020 against Deportivo Binacional.

References

External links
 
 

Living people
1995 births
Association football wingers
Peruvian footballers
Peruvian expatriate footballers
Peruvian Primera División players
Unión Comercio footballers
Cusco FC footballers
People from Tarapoto